Miklós Boskovits (1935 – 2011) was a Hungarian art historian who specialized in Italian renaissance art (and earlier).

Boskovits was born in Budapest. He wrote the Italian art catalogs for the Gemäldegalerie in Berlin (written between 1977 and 1980, published in 1988) and the Thyssen-Bornemisza collection (1990) before being asked to write the catalog of the Italian art collection for the National Gallery of Art.

Boskovits died in Florence.

References 

1935 births
2011 deaths
Writers from Budapest
Hungarian art historians